El Amor infiel is a 1974 Argentine romantic drama film directed by Mario David, who also wrote the script, which is based on a novel by María Angélica Bosco. It stars Zulma Faiad, Arturo Puig, Elena Sedova and Antonio Grimau.
Víctor Proncet composed the soundtrack.

Plot
The film begins with a card game, followed by a man wooing an attractive blonde at the casino. A romance blossoms but infidelities kick in.

Cast
  Zulma Faiad as Corina
  Arturo Puig as Esteban
  Elena Sedova as Julia
  Antonio Grimau as Marcerlo
  Elizabeth Makar as Silvia

Production
The film was produced by executive producer Hugo Flesc. The screenplay was written by the director Mario David, which is based on a novel by María Angélica Bosco. Cinematographer Adelqui Camuso was hired to shoot the film. Víctor Proncet composed the soundtrack, while the editing was done by Oscar Pariso.

Reception
The film premiered on 22 August 1974 in Buenos Aires. It was poorly received by critics, with La Nación describing it as a "Tedious history of infidelities… A long and slow comment on the inconsistency of unfaithful love". El Cronista Comercial remarked that there was "total inconsistency", while La Razón stated that "most of the development of the film is summarized in the image of Puig driving his car".

See also
List of Argentine films of 1974

References

External links
 

1974 films
1970s Spanish-language films
Argentine romantic drama films
Films based on Argentine novels
Films directed by Mario David
1974 romantic drama films